Acquasparta is a town and comune in the province of Terni (Umbria, central Italy). It is located on a hill above the Naia Valley and the river of the same name, facing the Monti Martani mountain range.

It also sits between two hot springs, the Amerino and the Furapane.

History
The name's origin is traditionally connected to the Roman toponym of Aquas Partas ("divided waters" or "between the waters"), about which, however, no documentation exists. More probably, the name born from the presence of several different water sources in the area.

During the ancient Roman domination the area was a retreat – a spa whose mineralized hot water baths were easily accessible from Rome along the west branch of the via Flaminia. Thermal baths remain open to the public today.

The city was later part of the Terre Arnolfe, and was later subjected to Todi. Subsequently, in 1588, it became a fief of the Cesi family.

Monuments and sites of interest
Its historical center was once surrounded by medieval walls but, now mostly torn down, leaving only short stretches and a few cylindrical towers that at one time served as part of the town's defenses.

Inside the old part of town, which is quiet and  unprepossessing, the principal building of note is the Renaissance-style Palazzo Cesi, started in 1564 and completed in 1579 by the architect Giovanni Domenico Bianchi. The Palazzo is owned by the University of Perugia and is in very poor, but improving, condition. The main portal includes some fine ashlar work and its interior features impressive carved wooden ceilings. It also possesses a capacious and delightful courtyard.  Next to the Palazzo is a loggia with some remnants of Roman foundations.

The palace's original owner, Federico Cesi, sponsored here an early "scientific society" known as the Accademia dei Lincei, attracting such teachers as Galileo Galilei. Today the palace hosts a small museum with a number of ancient artefacts, including Roman stone work from nearby Carsulae. The building is also used for meetings and traveling exhibitions.

The surrounding countryside is charming in the Umbrian way, spotted with a few small castles such as the one at Configni.  Also, along the via Flaminia, going north, is the ruins of another Roman bridge, the Ponte Fonnaia.

Religious sites and monuments
San Francesco: Romanesque church built in 1290, but with a Gothic architecture facade
Madonna of the Cross: church completed in 1606
Santissimo Sacramento: church incorporating a Roman Mosaic in its floor, is a very good example of 17th-century architecture
Santa Cecilia, built in the 16th century, contains an elegant chapel in which lies the tomb of Federico Cesi.
San Giovanni de Butris: church a short way from Acquasparta, built on the remains of a Roman bridge, and incorporates very large Roman stone blocks.

References

External links 

Official website
Bill Thayer's Gazetteer of Italy

Cities and towns in Umbria